Baron Rich was a title in the Peerage of England. It was created in 1547 and was absorbed into the Earldom of Warwick in 1618. It became extinct in 1759.

History

The title was created in 1547 for Sir Richard Rich who was made Baron Rich, of Leez. Rich was a prominent lawyer and politician, who served as Solicitor General and Speaker of the House of Commons and was Lord Chancellor of England from 1547 to 1551.  The Rich family descended from Richard Rich, a wealthy mercer who served as Sheriff of London in 1441, and Sir Richard was his great-grandson.

He was succeeded by his son, Robert, the second Baron. His son Robert Rich, 3rd Baron Rich, was created Earl of Warwick in the Peerage of England in 1618. Henry Rich, son of Robert, 3rd Baron Rich was created Baron Kensington in 1623 and Earl of Holland in 1624. His other son, Richard, was the first husband of Catherine Knyvet and supported the Reformation. From this point the history of the barony was tied to the history of the Earldom of Warwick.

The last of the line was Edward Rich, 10th Baron Rich, who was also 8th Earl Warwick and 5th Earl Holland. On his death in 1759 all the titles became extinct.

Barons Rich (1547)
Richard Rich, 1st Baron Rich (c. 1496–1567)
Robert Rich, 2nd Baron Rich (c. 1538–1581)  
Robert Rich, 3rd Baron Rich (d. 1619) (created Earl of Warwick in 1618)
Robert Rich, 4th Baron, 2nd Earl of Warwick (1587–1658)
Robert Rich, 5th Baron, 3rd Earl of Warwick (1611–1659)
Charles Rich, 6th Baron, 4th Earl of Warwick (1619–1673)
Robert Rich, 7th Baron, 5th Earl of Warwick, 2nd Earl of Holland (1620–1675)
Henry Rich, Lord Kensington (1642–1659)
Edward Rich, 8th Baron, 6th Earl of Warwick, 3rd Earl of Holland (1673–1701)
Edward Henry Rich, 9th Baron, 7th Earl of Warwick, 4th Earl of Holland (1697–1721)
Edward Rich, 10th Baron, 8th Earl of Warwick, 5th Earl of Holland (1695–1759)

See also
Earl of Warwick (1618)
Earl of Holland
Baron Kensington

References
Kidd, Charles, Williamson, David (editors). Debrett's Peerage and Baronetage (1990 edition). New York: St Martin's Press, 1990.

External links

www.thepeerage.com

Rich family
Extinct baronies in the Peerage of England
Noble titles created in 1547